The blue-rumped manakin (Lepidothrix isidorei) is a species of bird in the family Pipridae. It is found in Colombia, Ecuador, and Peru. Its natural habitat is montane forest and, in Ecuador, the species is considered a foothill specialty. These tiny manakins, which average 8 cm (3.1 in) in length, are infrequently encountered away from their leks, where the black, white-capped and blue backed males display for female attentions.

References

 "The Birds of Ecuador by Robert S. Ridgely & Paul Greenfield. Cornell University Press (2001), .

blue-rumped manakin
Birds of the Colombian Andes
Birds of the Ecuadorian Andes
Birds of the Peruvian Andes
blue-rumped manakin
blue-rumped manakin
Taxonomy articles created by Polbot